Modal logic is a collection of formal systems developed to represent statements about necessity and possibility. It plays a major role in philosophy of language, epistemology, metaphysics, and natural language semantics. For instance the modal formula  can be read as "possibly " while  can be read as "necessarily ". Modal logics can be used to represent different phenomena depending on what kind of necessity and possibility is under consideration. When  is used to represent epistemic necessity,  states that  is epistemically necessary, or in other words that it is known. When  is used to represent deontic necessity,  states that  is a moral or legal obligation.

In the standard relational semantics for modal logic, formulas are assigned truth values relative to a possible world. A formula's truth value at one possible world can depend on the truth values of other formulas at other accessible possible worlds. In particular,  is true at a world if  is true at some accessible possible world, while  is true at a world if  is true at every accessible possible world. A variety of proof systems exist which are sound and complete with respect to the semantics one gets by restricting the accessibility relation. For instance, the deontic modal logic D is sound and complete if one requires the accessibility relation to be serial.

While the intuition behind modal logic dates back to antiquity, the first modal axiomatic systems were developed by C. I. Lewis in 1912. The now-standard relational semantics emerged in the mid twentieth century from work by Arthur Prior, Jaakko Hintikka, and Saul Kripke. Recent developments include alternative topological semantics such as neighborhood semantics as well as applications of the relational semantics beyond its original philosophical motivation. Such applications include game theory, moral and legal theory, web design, multiverse-based set theory, and social epistemology.

Syntax of modal operators  

The former is conventionally read aloud as "necessarily", and can be used to represent notions such as moral or legal obligation, knowledge, historical inevitability, among others. The latter is typically read as "possibly" and can be used to represent notions including permission, ability, compatibility with evidence.

Thus, the language  of basic propositional logic can be defined recursively as follows.

Modal operators can be added to other kinds of logic by introducing rules analogous to #4 and #5 above. However, separate syntactic rules are necessary in systems where the two operators are not interdefinable.

These notations are particularly common in systems which use multiple modal operators simultaneously. For instance, a combined epistemic-deontic logic could use the formula  read as "I know P is permitted". Systems of modal logic can include infinitely many modal operators distinguished by indices, i.e.

Semantics

Relational semantics

Basic notions 

The standard semantics for modal logic is called the relational semantics. In this approach, the truth of a formula is determined relative to a point which is often called a possible world. For a formula that contains a modal operator, its truth value can depend on what is true at other accessible worlds. Thus, the relational semantics interprets formulas of modal logic using models defined as follows.

 A relational model is a tuple  where:
  is a set of possible worlds
  is a binary relation on 
  is a valuation function which assigns a truth value to each pair of an atomic formula and a world, (i.e.  where  is the set of atomic formulae)

The set  is often called the universe. The binary relation  is called an accessibility relation, and it controls which worlds can "see" each other for the sake of determining what is true. For example,  means that the  world  is accessible from world . Finally, the function  is known as a valuation function. It determines which atomic formulas are true at which worlds.

Then we recursively define the truth of a formula at a world  in a model :

  iff 
  iff 
  iff  and 

Possibility thereby depends upon the accessibility relation , which allows us to express the relative nature of possibility. For example, we might say that given our laws of physics it is not possible for humans to travel faster than the speed of light, but that given other circumstances it could have been possible to do so. Using the accessibility relation we can translate this scenario as follows: At all of the worlds accessible to our own world, it is not the case that humans can travel faster than the speed of light, but at one of these accessible worlds there is another world accessible from those worlds but not accessible from our own at which humans can travel faster than the speed of light.

Frames and completeness

The choice of accessibility relation alone can sometimes be sufficient to guarantee the truth or falsity of a formula. For instance, consider a model  whose accessibility relation is reflexive. Because the relation is reflexive, we will have that  for any  regardless of which valuation function is used. For this reason, modal logicians sometimes talk about frames, which are the portion of a relational model excluding the valuation function.

The different systems of modal logic are defined using frame conditions. A frame is called:

 reflexive if w R w, for every w in G
 symmetric if w R u implies u R w, for all w and u in G
 transitive if w R u and u R q together imply w R q, for all w, u, q in G.
 serial if, for every w in G there is some u in G such that w R u.
 Euclidean if, for every u, t, and w, w R u and w R t implies u R t (by symmetry, it also implies t R u, as well as t R t and u R u)

The logics that stem from these frame conditions are:
K := no conditions
D := serial
T := reflexive
B := reflexive and symmetric
S4 := reflexive and transitive
S5 := reflexive and Euclidean

The Euclidean property along with reflexivity yields symmetry and transitivity. (The Euclidean property can be obtained, as well, from symmetry and transitivity.) Hence if the accessibility relation R is reflexive and Euclidean, R is provably symmetric and transitive as well. Hence for models of S5, R is an equivalence relation, because R is reflexive, symmetric and transitive.

We can prove that these frames produce the same set of valid sentences as do the frames where all worlds can see all other worlds of W (i.e., where R is a "total" relation). This gives the corresponding modal graph which is total complete (i.e., no more edges (relations) can be added). For example, in any modal logic based on frame conditions:
  if and only if for some element u of G, it holds that  and w R u.

If we consider frames based on the total relation we can just say that
  if and only if for some element u of G, it holds that .
We can drop the accessibility clause from the latter stipulation because in such total frames it is trivially true of all w and u that w R u. But note that this does not have to be the case in all S5 frames, which can still consist of multiple parts that are fully connected among themselves but still disconnected from each other.

All of these logical systems can also be defined axiomatically, as is shown in the next section.

Topological semantics 

Modal logic has also been interpreted using topological structures. For instance, the Interior Semantics interprets formulas of modal logic as follows.

The basic interior semantics interprets formulas of modal logic as follows:

  iff 
  iff 
  iff  and 
  iff for some  we have both that  and also that  for all 

Topological approaches subsume relational ones, allowing non-normal modal logics. The extra structure they provide also allows a transparent way of modeling certain concepts such as the evidence or justification one has for one's beliefs. Topological semantics is widely used in recent work in formal epistemology and has antecedents in earlier work such as David Lewis and Angelika Kratzer's logics for counterfactuals.

Axiomatic systems

The first formalizations of modal logic were axiomatic. Numerous variations with very different properties have been proposed since C. I. Lewis began working in the area in 1912. Hughes and Cresswell (1996), for example, describe 42 normal and 25 non-normal modal logics. Zeman (1973) describes some systems Hughes and Cresswell omit.

Modern treatments of modal logic begin by augmenting the propositional calculus with two unary operations, one denoting "necessity" and the other "possibility". The notation of C. I. Lewis, much employed since, denotes "necessarily p" by a prefixed "box" (□p) whose scope is established by parentheses. Likewise, a prefixed "diamond" (◇p) denotes "possibly p". Similar to the quantifiers in first-order logic, "necessarily p" (□p) does not assume the range of quantification (the set of accessible possible worlds in Kripke semantics) to be non-empty, whereas "possibly p" (◇p) often implicitly assumes  (viz. the set of accessible possible worlds is non-empty). Regardless of notation, each of these operators is definable in terms of the other in classical modal logic:
Hence □ and ◇ form a dual pair of operators.

In many modal logics, the necessity and possibility operators satisfy the following analogues of de Morgan's laws from Boolean algebra:

"It is not necessary that X" is logically equivalent to "It is possible that not X".
"It is not possible that X" is logically equivalent to "It is necessary that not X".

Precisely what axioms and rules must be added to the propositional calculus to create a usable system of modal logic is a matter of philosophical opinion, often driven by the theorems one wishes to prove; or, in computer science, it is a matter of what sort of computational or deductive system one wishes to model.  Many modal logics, known collectively as normal modal logics, include the following rule and axiom:
 N, Necessitation Rule: If p is a theorem/tautology (of any system/model invoking N), then □p is likewise a theorem (i.e. ).
 K, Distribution Axiom: 

The weakest normal modal logic, named "K" in honor of Saul Kripke, is simply the propositional calculus augmented by □, the rule N, and the axiom K. K is weak in that it fails to determine whether a proposition can be necessary but only contingently necessary. That is, it is not a theorem of K that if □p is true then □□p is true, i.e., that necessary truths are "necessarily necessary". If such perplexities are deemed forced and artificial, this defect of K is not a great one. In any case, different answers to such questions yield different systems of modal logic.

Adding axioms to K gives rise to other well-known modal systems. One cannot prove in K that if "p is necessary" then p is true. The axiom T remedies this defect:
T, Reflexivity Axiom:  (If p is necessary, then p is the case.) 
T holds in most but not all modal logics. Zeman (1973) describes a few exceptions, such as S10.

Other well-known elementary axioms are:
4: 
B: 
D: 
5: 

These yield the systems (axioms in bold, systems in italics):
K := K + N
T := K + T
S4 := T + 4
S5 :=  T + 5
D := K + D.
K through S5 form a nested hierarchy of systems, making up the core of normal modal logic. But specific rules or sets of rules may be appropriate for specific systems. For example, in deontic logic,  (If it ought to be that p, then it is permitted that p) seems appropriate, but we should probably not include that . In fact, to do so is to commit the naturalistic fallacy (i.e. to state that what is natural is also good, by saying that if p is the case, p ought to be permitted).

The commonly employed system S5 simply makes all modal truths necessary. For example, if p is possible, then it is "necessary" that p is possible. Also, if p is necessary, then it is necessary that p is necessary. Other systems of modal logic have been formulated, in part because S5 does not describe every kind of modality of interest.

Structural proof theory
Sequent calculi and systems of natural deduction have been developed for several modal logics, but it has proven hard to combine generality with other features expected of good structural proof theories, such as purity (the proof theory does not introduce extra-logical notions such as labels) and analyticity (the logical rules support a clean notion of analytic proof).  More complex calculi have been applied to modal logic to achieve generality.

Decision methods
Analytic tableaux provide the most popular decision method for modal logics.

Modal logics in philosophy

Alethic logic

Modalities of necessity and possibility are called alethic modalities. They are also sometimes called special modalities, from the Latin species. Modal logic was first developed to deal with these concepts, and only afterward was extended to others.  For this reason, or perhaps for their familiarity and simplicity, necessity and possibility are often casually treated as the subject matter of modal logic. Moreover, it is easier to make sense of relativizing necessity, e.g. to legal, physical, nomological, epistemic, and so on, than it is to make sense of relativizing other notions.

In classical modal logic, a proposition is said to be
possible if it is not necessarily false (regardless of whether it is actually true or actually false);
necessary if it is not possibly false (i.e. true and necessarily true);
contingent if it is not necessarily false and not necessarily true (i.e. possible but not necessarily true);
impossible if it is not possibly true (i.e. false and necessarily false).

In classical modal logic, therefore, the notion of either possibility or necessity may be taken to be basic, where these other notions are defined in terms of it in the manner of De Morgan duality. Intuitionistic modal logic treats possibility and necessity as not perfectly symmetric.

For example, suppose that while walking to the convenience store we pass Friedrich's house, and observe that the lights are off. On the way back, we observe that they have been turned on.
 "Somebody or something turned the lights on" is necessary.
 "Friedrich turned the lights on", "Friedrich's roommate Max turned the lights on" and "A burglar named Adolf broke into Friedrich's house and turned the lights on" are contingent.
 All of the above statements are possible.
 It is impossible that Socrates (who has been dead for over two thousand years) turned the lights on.
(Of course, this analogy does not apply alethic modality in a truly rigorous fashion; for it to do so, it would have to axiomatically make such statements as "human beings cannot rise from the dead", "Socrates was a human being and not an immortal vampire", and "we did not take hallucinogenic drugs which caused us to falsely believe the lights were on", ad infinitum. Absolute certainty of truth or falsehood exists only in the sense of logically constructed abstract concepts such as "it is impossible to draw a triangle with four sides" and "all bachelors are unmarried".)

For those having difficulty with the concept of something being possible but not true, the meaning of these terms may be made more comprehensible by thinking of multiple "possible worlds" (in the sense of Leibniz) or "alternate universes"; something "necessary" is true in all possible worlds, something "possible" is true in at least one possible world.  These "possible world semantics" are formalized with Kripke semantics.

Physical possibility
Something is physically, or nomically, possible if it is permitted by the laws of physics. For example, current theory is thought to allow for there to be an atom with an atomic number of 126, even if there are no such atoms in existence.  In contrast, while it is logically possible to accelerate beyond the speed of light, modern science stipulates that it is not physically possible for material particles or information.

Metaphysical possibility

Philosophers debate if objects have properties independent of those dictated by scientific laws. For example, it might be metaphysically necessary, as some who advocate physicalism have thought, that all thinking beings have bodies and can experience the passage of time. Saul Kripke has argued that every person necessarily has the parents they do have: anyone with different parents would not be the same person.

Metaphysical possibility has been thought to be more restricting than bare logical possibility (i.e., fewer things are metaphysically possible than are logically possible). However, its exact relation (if any) to logical possibility or to physical possibility is a matter of dispute. Philosophers also disagree over whether metaphysical truths are necessary merely "by definition", or whether they reflect some underlying deep facts about the world, or something else entirely.

Epistemic logic

Epistemic modalities (from the Greek episteme, knowledge), deal with the certainty of sentences.  The □ operator is translated as  "x knows that…", and the ◇ operator is translated as "For all x knows, it may be true that…"  In ordinary speech both metaphysical and epistemic modalities are often expressed in similar words; the following contrasts may help:

A person, Jones, might reasonably say both: (1) "No, it is not possible that Bigfoot exists; I am quite certain of that"; and, (2) "Sure, it's possible that Bigfoots could exist". What Jones means by (1) is that, given all the available information, there is no question remaining as to whether Bigfoot exists. This is an epistemic claim. By (2) he makes the metaphysical claim that it is possible for Bigfoot to exist, even though he does not: there is no physical or biological reason that large, featherless, bipedal creatures with thick hair could not exist in the forests of North America (regardless of whether or not they do). Similarly, "it is possible for the person reading this sentence to be fourteen feet tall and named Chad" is metaphysically true (such a person would not somehow be prevented from doing so on account of their height and name), but not alethically true unless you match that description, and not epistemically true if it's known that fourteen-foot-tall human beings have never existed.

From the other direction, Jones might say, (3) "It is possible that Goldbach's conjecture is true; but also possible that it is false", and also (4) "if it is true, then it is necessarily true, and not possibly false". Here Jones means that it is epistemically possible that it is true or false, for all he knows (Goldbach's conjecture has not been proven either true or false), but if there is a proof (heretofore undiscovered), then it would show that it is not logically possible for Goldbach's conjecture to be false—there could be no set of numbers that violated it. Logical possibility is a form of alethic possibility; (4) makes a claim about whether it is possible (i.e., logically speaking) that a mathematical truth to have been false, but (3) only makes a claim about whether it is possible, for all Jones knows, (i.e., speaking of certitude) that the mathematical claim is specifically either true or false, and so again Jones does not contradict himself.  It is worthwhile to observe that Jones is not necessarily correct: It is possible (epistemically) that Goldbach's conjecture is both true and unprovable.

Epistemic possibilities also bear on the actual world in a way that metaphysical possibilities do not. Metaphysical possibilities bear on ways the world might have been, but epistemic possibilities bear on the way the world may be (for all we know). Suppose, for example, that I want to know whether or not to take an umbrella before I leave. If you tell me "it is possible that it is raining outside" – in the sense of epistemic possibility – then that would weigh on whether or not I take the umbrella. But if you just tell me that "it is possible for it to rain outside" – in the sense of metaphysical possibility – then I am no better off for this bit of modal enlightenment.

Some features of epistemic modal logic are in debate. For example, if x knows that p, does x know that it knows that p? That is to say, should □P → □□P be an axiom in these systems? While the answer to this question is unclear, there is at least one axiom that is generally included in epistemic modal logic, because it is minimally true of all normal modal logics (see the section on axiomatic systems):
 K, Distribution Axiom: .

It has been questioned whether the epistemic and alethic modalities should be considered distinct from each other. The criticism states that there is no real difference between "the truth in the world" (alethic) and "the truth in an individual's mind" (epistemic). An investigation has not found a single language in which alethic and epistemic modalities are formally distinguished, as by the means of a grammatical mood.

Temporal logic

Temporal logic is an approach to the semantics of expressions with tense, that is, expressions with qualifications of when.  Some expressions, such as  '2 + 2 = 4', are true at all times, while tensed expressions such as 'John is happy' are only true sometimes.

In temporal logic, tense constructions are treated in terms of modalities, where a standard method for formalizing talk of time is to use two pairs of operators, one for the past and one for the future (P will just mean 'it is presently the case that P'). For example:

FP : It will sometimes be the case that P
GP : It will always be the case that P
PP : It was sometime the case that P
HP : It has always been the case that P

There are then at least three modal logics that we can develop. For example, we can stipulate that,

 = P is the case at some time t
 = P is the case at every time t

Or we can trade these operators to deal only with the future (or past). For example,

 = FP
 = GP

or,

 = P and/or FP
 = P and GP

The operators F and G may seem initially foreign, but they create normal modal systems. Note that FP is the same as ¬G¬P. We can combine the above operators to form complex statements. For example, PP → □PP says (effectively), Everything that is past and true is necessary.

It seems reasonable to say that possibly it will rain tomorrow, and possibly it won't; on the other hand, since we can't change the past, if it is true that it rained yesterday, it cannot be true that it may not have rained yesterday. It seems the past is "fixed", or necessary, in a way the future is not. This is sometimes referred to as accidental necessity. But if the past is "fixed", and everything that is in the future will eventually be in the past, then it seems plausible to say that future events are necessary too.

Similarly, the problem of future contingents considers the semantics of assertions about the future: is either of the propositions 'There will be a sea battle tomorrow', or 'There will not be a sea battle tomorrow' now true?  Considering this thesis led Aristotle to reject the principle of bivalence for assertions concerning the future.

Additional binary operators are also relevant to temporal logics (see Linear temporal logic).

Versions of temporal logic can be used in computer science to model computer operations and prove theorems about them. In one version, ◇P means "at a future time in the computation it is possible that the computer state will be such that P is true"; □P means "at all future times in the computation P will be true". In another version, ◇P means "at the immediate next state of the computation, P might be true"; □P means "at the immediate next state of the computation, P will be true". These differ in the choice of Accessibility relation. (P always means "P is true at the current computer state".) These two examples involve nondeterministic or not-fully-understood computations; there are many other modal logics specialized to different types of program analysis. Each one naturally leads to slightly different axioms.

Deontic logic

Likewise talk of morality, or of obligation and norms generally, seems to have a modal structure.  The difference between "You must do this" and "You may do this" looks a lot like the difference between "This is necessary" and "This is possible".  Such logics are called deontic, from the Greek for "duty".

Deontic logics commonly lack the axiom T semantically corresponding to the reflexivity of the accessibility relation in Kripke semantics: in symbols, . Interpreting □ as "it is obligatory that", T informally says that every obligation is true. For example, if it is obligatory not to kill others (i.e. killing is morally forbidden), then T implies that people actually do not kill others. The consequent is obviously false.

Instead, using Kripke semantics, we say that though our own world does not realize all obligations, the worlds accessible to it do (i.e., T holds at these worlds). These worlds are called idealized worlds. P is obligatory with respect to our own world if at all idealized worlds accessible to our world, P holds. Though this was one of the first interpretations of the formal semantics, it has recently come under criticism.

One other principle that is often (at least traditionally) accepted as a deontic principle is D, which corresponds to the seriality (or extendability or unboundedness) of the accessibility relation. It is an embodiment of the Kantian idea that "ought implies can". (Clearly the "can" can be interpreted in various senses, e.g. in a moral or alethic sense.)

Intuitive problems with deontic logic
When we try to formalize ethics with standard modal logic, we run into some problems. Suppose that we have a proposition K: you have stolen some money, and another, Q: you have stolen a small amount of money. Now suppose we want to express the thought that "if you have stolen some money, it ought to be a small amount of money". There are two likely candidates,
 (1) 
 (2) 

But (1) and K together entail □Q, which says that it ought to be the case that you have stolen a small amount of money. This surely isn't right, because you ought not to have stolen anything at all. But that can't be right, and is not right when we use natural language. Telling someone they should not steal certainly does not imply that they should steal large amounts of money if they do engage in theft.

Doxastic logic 

Doxastic logic concerns the logic of belief (of some set of agents). The term doxastic is derived from the ancient Greek doxa which means "belief". Typically, a doxastic logic uses □, often written "B", to mean "It is believed that", or when relativized to a particular agent s, "It is believed by s that".

Metaphysical questions 

In the most common interpretation of modal logic, one considers "logically possible worlds". If a statement is true in all possible worlds, then it is a necessary truth. If a statement happens to be true in our world, but is not true in all possible worlds, then it is a contingent truth. A statement that is true in some possible world (not necessarily our own) is called a possible truth.

Under this "possible worlds idiom," to maintain that Bigfoot's existence is possible but not actual, one says, "There is some possible world in which Bigfoot exists; but in the actual world, Bigfoot does not exist". However, it is unclear what this claim commits us to. Are we really alleging the existence of possible worlds, every bit as real as our actual world, just not actual? Saul Kripke believes that 'possible world' is something of a misnomer – that the term 'possible world' is just a useful way of visualizing the concept of possibility. For him, the sentences "you could have rolled a 4 instead of a 6" and "there is a possible world where you rolled a 4, but you rolled a 6 in the actual world" are not significantly different statements, and neither commit us to the existence of a possible world. David Lewis, on the other hand, made himself notorious by biting the bullet, asserting that all merely possible worlds are as real as our own, and that what distinguishes our world as actual is simply that it is indeed our world – this world. That position is a major tenet of "modal realism". Some philosophers decline to endorse any version of modal realism, considering it ontologically extravagant, and prefer to seek various ways to paraphrase away these ontological commitments. Robert Adams holds that 'possible worlds' are better thought of as 'world-stories', or consistent sets of propositions. Thus, it is possible that you rolled a 4 if such a state of affairs can be described coherently.

Computer scientists will generally pick a highly specific interpretation of the modal operators specialized to the particular sort of computation being analysed.  In place of "all worlds", you may have "all possible next states of the computer", or "all possible future states of the computer".

Further applications
Modal logics have begun to be used in areas of the humanities such as literature, poetry, art and history.

History
The basic ideas of modal logic date back to antiquity. Aristotle developed a modal syllogistic in Book I of his Prior Analytics (ch. 8–22), which Theophrastus attempted to improve. There are also passages in Aristotle's work, such as the famous sea-battle argument in De Interpretatione §9, that are now seen as anticipations of the connection of modal logic with potentiality and time. In the Hellenistic period, the logicians Diodorus Cronus, Philo the Dialectician and the Stoic Chrysippus each developed a modal system that accounted for the interdefinability of possibility and necessity, accepted axiom T (see below), and combined elements of modal logic and temporal logic in attempts to solve the notorious Master Argument. The earliest formal system of modal logic was developed by Avicenna, who ultimately developed a theory of "temporally modal" syllogistic. Modal logic as a self-aware subject owes much to the writings of the Scholastics, in particular William of Ockham and John Duns Scotus, who reasoned informally in a modal manner, mainly to analyze statements about essence and accident.

In the 19th century, Hugh MacColl made innovative contributions to modal logic, but did not find much acknowledgment. C. I. Lewis founded modern modal logic in a series of scholarly articles beginning in 1912 with "Implication and the Algebra of Logic". Lewis was led to invent modal logic, and specifically strict implication, on the grounds that classical logic grants paradoxes of material implication such as the principle that a falsehood implies any proposition. This work culminated in his 1932 book Symbolic Logic (with C. H. Langford), which introduced the five systems S1 through S5.

After Lewis, modal logic received little attention for several decades. Nicholas Rescher has argued that this was because Bertrand Russell rejected it. However, Jan Dejnozka has argued against this view, stating that a modal system which Dejnozka calls "MDL" is described in Russell's works, although Russell did believe the concept of modality to "come from confusing propositions with propositional functions," as he wrote in The Analysis of Matter.

Ruth C. Barcan (later Ruth Barcan Marcus) developed the first axiomatic systems of quantified modal logic — first and second order extensions of Lewis' S2, S4, and S5. Arthur Norman Prior warned her to prepare well in the debates concerning quantified modal logic with Willard Van Orman Quine, because of bias against modal logic.

The contemporary era in modal semantics began in 1959, when Saul Kripke (then only a 18-year-old Harvard University undergraduate) introduced the now-standard Kripke semantics for modal logics. These are commonly referred to as "possible worlds" semantics. Kripke and A. N. Prior had previously corresponded at some length. Kripke semantics is basically simple, but proofs are eased using semantic-tableaux or analytic tableaux, as explained by E. W. Beth.

A. N. Prior created modern temporal logic, closely related to modal logic, in 1957 by adding modal operators [F] and [P] meaning "eventually" and "previously". Vaughan Pratt introduced dynamic logic in 1976. In 1977, Amir Pnueli proposed using temporal logic to formalise the behaviour of continually operating concurrent programs. Flavors of temporal logic include propositional dynamic logic (PDL), (propositional) linear temporal logic (LTL), computation tree logic (CTL), Hennessy–Milner logic, and T.

The mathematical structure of modal logic, namely Boolean algebras augmented with unary operations (often called modal algebras), began to emerge with J. C. C. McKinsey's 1941 proof that S2 and S4 are decidable, and reached full flower in the work of Alfred Tarski and his student Bjarni Jónsson (Jónsson and Tarski 1951–52). This work revealed that S4 and S5 are models of interior algebra, a proper extension of Boolean algebra originally designed to capture the properties of the interior and closure operators of topology. Texts on modal logic typically do little more than mention its connections with the study of Boolean algebras and topology. For a thorough survey of the history of formal modal logic and of the associated mathematics, see Robert Goldblatt (2006).

See also

 Accessibility relation
 Conceptual necessity
 Counterpart theory
 David Kellogg Lewis
 De dicto and de re
 Description logic
 Doxastic logic
 Dynamic logic
 Enthymeme
 Free choice inference
 Hybrid logic
 Interior algebra
 Interpretability logic
 Kripke semantics
 Metaphysical necessity
 Modal verb
 Multimodal logic
 Multi-valued logic
 Neighborhood semantics
 Provability logic
 Regular modal logic
 Relevance logic
 Strict conditional
 Two-dimensionalism

Notes

References
 This article includes material from the Free On-line Dictionary of Computing, used with permission under the GFDL.
 Barcan-Marcus, Ruth JSL 11 (1946) and JSL 112 (1947) and "Modalities", OUP, 1993, 1995.
 Beth, Evert W., 1955. "Semantic entailment and formal derivability", Mededlingen van de Koninklijke Nederlandse Akademie van Wetenschappen, Afdeling Letterkunde, N.R. Vol 18, no 13, 1955, pp 309–42. Reprinted in Jaakko Intikka (ed.) The Philosophy of Mathematics, Oxford University Press, 1969 (Semantic Tableaux proof methods).
 Beth, Evert W., "Formal Methods: An Introduction to Symbolic Logic and to the Study of Effective Operations in Arithmetic and Logic", D. Reidel, 1962 (Semantic Tableaux proof methods).
 Blackburn, P.; van Benthem, J.; and Wolter, Frank; Eds. (2006) Handbook of Modal Logic. North Holland.
 Blackburn, Patrick; de Rijke, Maarten; and Venema, Yde (2001) Modal Logic. Cambridge University Press. 
 Chagrov, Aleksandr; and Zakharyaschev, Michael (1997) Modal Logic. Oxford University Press. 
 Chellas, B. F. (1980) Modal Logic: An Introduction. Cambridge University Press. 
 Cresswell, M. J. (2001) "Modal Logic" in Goble, Lou; Ed., The Blackwell Guide to Philosophical Logic. Basil Blackwell: 136–58. 
 Fitting, Melvin; and Mendelsohn, R. L. (1998) First Order Modal Logic. Kluwer. 
 James Garson (2006) Modal Logic for Philosophers. Cambridge University Press. . A thorough introduction to modal logic, with coverage of various derivation systems and a distinctive approach to the use of diagrams in aiding comprehension.
 Girle, Rod (2000) Modal Logics and Philosophy. Acumen (UK). . Proof by refutation trees. A good introduction to the varied interpretations of modal logic.
 Goldblatt, Robert (1992) "Logics of Time and Computation", 2nd ed., CSLI Lecture Notes No. 7. University of Chicago Press.
 —— (1993) Mathematics of Modality, CSLI Lecture Notes No. 43. University of Chicago Press.
 —— (2006) "Mathematical Modal Logic: a View of its Evolution", in Gabbay, D. M.; and Woods, John; Eds., Handbook of the History of Logic, Vol. 6. Elsevier BV.
 Goré, Rajeev (1999) "Tableau Methods for Modal and Temporal Logics" in D'Agostino, M.; Gabbay, D.; Haehnle, R.; and Posegga, J.; Eds., Handbook of Tableau Methods. Kluwer: 297–396.
 Hughes, G. E., and Cresswell, M. J. (1996) A New Introduction to Modal Logic. Routledge. 
 Jónsson, B. and Tarski, A., 1951–52, "Boolean Algebra with Operators I and II", American Journal of Mathematics 73: 891–939 and 74: 129–62.
 Kracht, Marcus (1999) Tools and Techniques in Modal Logic, Studies in Logic and the Foundations of Mathematics No. 142. North Holland.
 Lemmon, E. J. (with Scott, D.) (1977) An Introduction to Modal Logic, American Philosophical Quarterly Monograph Series, no. 11 (Krister Segerberg, series ed.). Basil Blackwell.
 Lewis, C. I. (with Langford, C. H.) (1932). Symbolic Logic. Dover reprint, 1959.
 Prior, A. N. (1957) Time and Modality. Oxford University Press.
 Snyder, D. Paul "Modal Logic and its applications", Van Nostrand Reinhold Company, 1971 (proof tree methods).
 Zeman, J. J. (1973) Modal Logic. Reidel. Employs Polish notation.
 "History of logic", Britannica Online.

Further reading
 Ruth Barcan Marcus, Modalities, Oxford University Press, 1993.
 D. M. Gabbay, A. Kurucz, F. Wolter and M. Zakharyaschev, Many-Dimensional Modal Logics: Theory and Applications, Elsevier, Studies in Logic and the Foundations of Mathematics, volume 148, 2003, . [Covers many varieties of modal logics, e.g. temporal, epistemic, dynamic, description, spatial from a unified perspective with emphasis on computer science aspects, e.g. decidability and complexity.]
 Andrea Borghini, A Critical Introduction to the Metaphysics of Modality, New York: Bloomsbury, 2016.

External links
 Internet Encyclopedia of Philosophy:
 "Modal Logic: A Contemporary View" – by Johan van Benthem.
 "Rudolf Carnap's Modal Logic" – by MJ Cresswell.
 Stanford Encyclopedia of Philosophy:
 "Modal Logic" – by James Garson.
 "Modern Origins of Modal Logic" – by Roberta Ballarin.
 "Provability Logic" – by Rineke Verbrugge.
 Edward N. Zalta, 1995, "Basic Concepts in Modal Logic."
 John McCarthy, 1996, "Modal Logic."
 Molle a Java prover for experimenting with modal logics
 Suber, Peter, 2002, "Bibliography of Modal Logic."
 List of Logic Systems List of many modal logics with sources, by John Halleck.
 Advances in Modal Logic. Biannual international conference and book series in modal logic.
 S4prover A tableaux prover for S4 logic
 "Some Remarks on Logic and Topology" – by Richard Moot; exposits a topological semantics for the modal logic S4.
 LoTREC The most generic prover for modal logics  from IRIT/Toulouse University

Logic
 
Philosophical logic
Mathematical logic
Semantics